Kayyalathu Thomas Chacko is a retired Indian Administrative Service officer who held several public offices in the Government of India. He was appointed as the Directorate General of Foreign Trade of India in 2004. He is widely known for his commitment to increase India's participation and role in the global economy.

Early life and education
K.T. Chacko was born on October 29, 1947 to a  Syrian Orthodox Christian family, the youngest of four children, in Kottayam District, Kerala. He studied at the University College Trivandrum where he did his Masters in Economics, obtaining the 1st Rank in the University and in the State and was awarded 3 Gold Medals for meritorious achievements. He then went to study at John F. Kennedy School of Government Harvard University on Edward S. Mason Fellowship where he earned a master's degree in public administration (Class of 1984).

Career in the Government of India
K.T. Chacko joined the Indian Police Service in 1971. He wrote the civil service exam again next year and was accepted into the Indian Administrative Service. He joined the IAS as a trainee in 1973. As an officer of the Indian Administrative Service he served for over 33 years in executive, secretarial and Policy making assignments. During his career as an IAS officer, he spent 13 years of service in the Govt of India and served the State Govt of Madhya Pradesh for 20 years. Some of the key positions/assignments he held.

References

External links
 Thehindubusinessline.in
 Thehindubusinessline.in
 Businesstoday.intoday.in
 Investing.businessweek.com

Indian civil servants
Living people
Harvard Kennedy School alumni
Year of birth missing (living people)